Mad Wolf Mountain is located in the Lewis Range of the Glacier National Park in the U.S. state of Montana. Mad Wolf Mountain is just west of the Blackfeet Indian Reservation, and rises abruptly above the Great Plains. It stands at 8,341 feet, or 2,542 meters.

See also
 List of mountains and mountain ranges of Glacier National Park (U.S.)

References

Mountains of Glacier County, Montana
Mountains of Glacier National Park (U.S.)
Lewis Range
Mountains of Montana